Lostock Dam is a minor rockfill and clay core embankment dam with a concrete lined, flip bucket spillway across the Paterson River upstream of the village of East Gresford in the Hunter region of New South Wales, Australia. The dam's purpose includes flood mitigation, irrigation, water supply and conservation. Mini hydro-power facilities were retrofitted in 2010. The impounded reservoir is also called Lostock Dam.

Location and features
The dam was built by Dumez Australia under contract to the New South Wales Water Department of Land and Water Conservation following the drought of 1964–66. At that time there was a need for a water conservation storage in the Paterson Valley to stabilise and further develop rural productivity.

The ungated concrete lined, flip bucket chute spillway is capable of discharging .

Power generation
Constructed by Heidemann Hydro Australia, the facility is managed by Delta Electricity.

See also

 Delta Electricity
 Irrigation in Australia
 List of dams and reservoirs in New South Wales

References

External links
 
 Lostock Dam Fishing Information & Map
 Richard Woodward's Dam Projects

Dams completed in 1971
Energy infrastructure completed in 2010
Dungog Shire
Embankment dams
Dams in New South Wales
Hunter Region
Hydroelectric power stations in New South Wales